Frank E. Shipley (1891 – April 1971) was a Maryland state senator from 1955 to 1962.

In 1885, the owners of the Savage Mill leased their house in Savage, Maryland to Frank Shipley's family. Shipley became a general practicing doctor. During World War I, he served in the Army Medical Corps. From 1932-1948 he was the treasurer of Howard County. In 1962, Shipley bypassed the state schoolboard nominating commission recommendation of Fred Schoenbrodt, and installed C.Y. Stephens. In 1971, the Savage Masonic Hall was redecorated as a memorial to Shipley.

Biography 

Frank E. Shipley,

See also 
Savage, Maryland

References

1891 births
1971 deaths
People from Savage, Maryland
Democratic Party Maryland state senators
20th-century American politicians